Harold Donald Alexander (born October 20, 1970) is a former American football punter in the National Football League (NFL). Alexander was drafted in the third round by the Atlanta Falcons out of Appalachian State University in the 1993 NFL Draft.

References

1970 births
Living people
American football punters
Atlanta Falcons players
Appalachian State Mountaineers football players
Players of American football from South Carolina
People from Pickens, South Carolina